Alexandra Benjamin Krosney is an American actress and voice actor. She is best known for her role as Kristin Baxter on the ABC sitcom Last Man Standing during the show's first season.

Career
Some of Krosney's television roles include Bones, Lost, Cory in the House, ER, Nikita, Numb3rs, NCIS and the computer animated series Transformers: Prime.

Krosney also appeared in television films such as the Disney Channel Original Movie Read It and Weep, Nickelodeon original movies Shredderman Rules and The Last Day of Summer.

From 2011 to 2012, she co-starred in the ABC sitcom Last Man Standing starring Tim Allen. On June 11, 2012, it was announced that Krosney was let go from the sitcom for unspecified creative reasons. The role has been played by Amanda Fuller from season 2 onward.

Filmography

Film

Television

References

External links
 
 

21st-century American actresses
American child actresses
American film actresses
American television actresses
American voice actresses
Living people
Year of birth missing (living people)